"Feel 4 U" is the debut single of Swedish dance-pop production team Dream Beats which features the group Alcazar.

Dream Beats is a project led by Anders Hansson in collaboration with Felix Persson and Märta Grauers of Le Kid. They previously worked with Alcazar on the 2009 track "Stay the Night".

References

External links
Dream Beats website
Feel 4 U on Discogs

Alcazar (band) songs
Eurodance songs
2011 debut singles
Universal Music Group singles
2011 songs
Songs written by Anders Hansson (songwriter)